Rodger Whitten Simpson (June 4, 1898 – December 10, 1964) was a rear admiral of the United States Navy, who distinguished himself during World War II. The frigate  was named in his honor.

Biography
Simpson attended the University of Oregon for a year before entering the United States Naval Academy in June 1917. Midshipman Simpson served on the battleship , which was stationed in the Atlantic Ocean and part of Atlantic Fleet during World War I. Simpson was commissioned an ensign during June 1920, graduating in the class of 1921.

He commanded the destroyer  as a lieutenant commander during the Battle of the Santa Cruz Islands on 26 October 1942.

Simpson also served tours as commander, Training Command, Marianas; commander, Fleet Training Group, Western Pacific; Commander, Underway Training Unit, Guam; commanding officer, ; and commanding officer, Naval Station Treasure Island.

On April 6, 1944, Commodore Simpson commanded Task Flotilla 6. He orchestrated and planned the rescue of over 7,500 Allied prisoners of war and civilians interned in Japanese concentration camps.

In 1945, the Navy's Task Group 30.6 commanded by Commodore Simpson arrived in Tokyo Bay to undertake the emergency evacuation of Allied POWs in waterfront areas. Accompanying Simpson were Commander Harold E. Stassen, USNR, flag secretary to commander, Third Fleet, and Admiral William F. Halsey.

For this rescue, he was honored with the Legion of Merit. The citation in part reads, ". . . by freeing the prisoners before the actual signing of the surrender, he saved the lives of hundreds of sick and starving U.S. service people . . . ."

Simpson retired in 1951.

Duty stations

Awards and decorations
Among Rear Admiral Simpson's decorations and medals were the following:

Photographs
Rodger W. Simpson, Change of Command 1948 USS Atlanta
Rear Admiral Simpson Questioning Japanese Prisoners
Simpson And Cmdr Harold Stassen
Liberation of Allied Prisoners of War

References

1898 births
1964 deaths
Military personnel from Portland, Oregon
United States Navy admirals
United States Naval Academy alumni
United States Navy personnel of World War I
United States Navy World War II admirals
Recipients of the Navy Cross (United States)
Recipients of the Silver Star
Recipients of the Legion of Merit
Burials at Arlington National Cemetery